Nelson Omar Brodt Chávez (born 7 August 1943) is a Chilean actor, director, dramatist, and teacher, with an extensive career in theater, film, and television.

Career
Nelson Brodt began his career at the Theater of the University of Concepción, where he developed an intense theatrical focus.

In 1981 he directed  by Juan Radrigán. This production was well-received by critics and the public, both in Chile and abroad. He then adapted numerous works, including Candida Eréndida, Páramo, Chiloé cielos cubiertos, and Ánimas de día claro. He also dabbled in dramaturgy, writing plays such as Crónica de mujeres, El aprendiz, Siete golpes de arena, and Pide tres deseos. He took the last on a tour to Spain, where it received praise from specialized critics. In 2004 he was distinguished with the Santiago Municipal Literature Award, Theater Genre.

In 2008 he joined the cast of the hit series Los 80, where he had a lauded performance. In cinema he has acted in films such as Hechos consumados (1986),  (2007), and Y de pronto el amanecer (2017).

In parallel to his artistic activity, he has taught at various institutions and universities.

Theater

Works as director
 Redoble fúnebre para lobos y corderos (1980), Juan Radrigán
 Hechos consumados (1981), Juan Radrigán
 Candida Eréndida (1983), Gabriel García Márquez
 Peter and the Wolf (1983), Music by Prokofiev
 Manuel Leonidas Donaire y las cinco mujeres que lloraban por él (1984), Alejandro Sieveking, Teatro Itinerante
 No Exit (1984). Jean-Paul Sartre
 Oedipus Rex (1984), Sophocles, adaptation by Isidora Aguirre
 Páramo (1987), Juan Rulfo, dramatic adaptation and direction by Nelson Brodt
 Rinconete y Cortadillo (1988), Miguel de Cervantes, dramatic adaptation by Jorge Díaz
 Chiloé cielos cubiertos (1989), María Asunción Requena
 Martín Rivas (1991), Alberto Blest Gana
 Alsino mapuche (1992). Pedro Prado, dramatic adaptation and direction by Nelson Brodt
 Tres marías y una rosa (1993), David Benavente, Theater of the University of Concepción
 El Buscón (1994), Quevedo, dramatic adaptation and direction by Nelson Brodt
 Mujeres con trenzas negras (1997), collective creation and by Mireya Moreno
 Pide tres deseos (1997), staging and direction by Nelson Brodt
 Life of Galileo (1998), Bertolt Brecht
 Crónica de mujeres (1999), staging and direction by Nelson Brodt
 El aprendiz (2000), staging and direction by Nelson Brodt
 Galanes (2001), Roberto Fontanarrosa
 Mamma mía, la policía (2001), Dario Fo
 Siete golpes de arena (2003), staging and direction by Nelson Brodt
 Les Précieuses ridicules (2011), Molière, dramatic adaptation and direction by Nelson Brodt
 Ánimas de día claro (2013), Alejandro Sieveking, National Theater

Works as playwright
 Pide tres deseos (1997), assembled based on figures from Chilean popular mythology
 Crónica de mujeres (1999), work about women's claims in the 20th century in Chile
 El aprendiz (2000), popular satirical comedy
 Siete golpes de arena (2004), Municipal Literature Award, Theater Genre

Works as actor
 Tela de cebolla (1971), Gloria Cordero, Teatro Nuevo Popular, CUT - UTE
 25 años después (1971), Pedro Vianna, Company of Los Cuatro
 El embajador (1971), Isabel Allende, Company of Los Cuatro
 La maldición de la palabra (1972), Manuel Garrido, Teatro Nuevo Popular, CUT - UTE
 La viuda de Apablaza (1977), Germán Luco Cruchaga, direction by Rafael Benavente
 Rancagüa, 1814 (1978), Fernando Cuadra, National Theater, direction by Patricio Campos
 The Good Doctor (1979), Neil Simon, Chamber Theater, direction by Alejandro Castillo
 José (1980), Egon Wolff, Chamber Theater, direction by Alejandro Castillo
 Verde Julia, Paul Ableman, direction by Raúl Barrientos
 Three Sisters, Anton Chekhov, direction by Eugenio Guzmán, Theater of the University of Concepción
 Arlequín servidor de dos patrones, Carlo Goldoni, direction by Agustín Siré, Theater of the University of Concepción
 El umbral, José Chestá, direction by Roberto Navarrete, Theater of the University of Concepción
 The Zoo Story, Edward Albee, direction by Raúl Barrientos

Filmography

Film

Television series and miniseries

Telenovelas

Academic activities
 He was creator, director, and teacher of the School of Acting, Bellas Artes neighborhood, Santiago, Chile.
 He was director of the USACH Theater Group.
 He was professor of "Introduction to Staging" and "Direction of Actors" at the National Film School.
 He participates in the Explora-CONICYT Program "Dissemination and Assessment of Science and Technology through Dramaturgy".
 He directed the first generation of graduates of Theater Acting, University of Valparaíso.
 He currently works as a professor of Theater at the University of Santiago, Chile, USACH.

Awards and distinctions
 Santiago Municipal Literature Award, Theater Genre (20Q04), for Siete golpes de arena
 Hechos consumados, Best Play of the Year (1981), Art Critics' Circle Award
 La Cándida Eréndira, Best Play of the Year (1983), Art Critics' Circle Award
 Ánimas de día claro, Special Distinction (2013), Art Critics' Circle Award
 Hechos consumados, Best Production of the Season (1981), El Mercurio newspaper
 Alsino mapuche, Best Production (1992), Teatro de la Juventud Festival Award
 Pide tres deseos, Best Production and Best Director (1998), Ene Theater Festival, Municipality of Santiago
 Mujeres de trenzas negras, Won Traveling Theater Contest of the Ministry of Education
 The Good Doctor, "Laurel de Plata" Award of the newspaper Las Últimas Noticias (1979)
 Retrospective show of the work of Nelson Brodt (2000), Auditorium Telefónica, Santiago, Chile
 Invited to the First Festival of Latin American Theater, with La Cándida Eréndira, Córdoba, Argentina (1983)
 Invited to the "Comitato Internazionale 8 de Marzo" in Italy, tour with Mujeres con Trenzas Negras (2000)
 Invited to the National Unified Theater Encounter - TENU, meeting with teachers of Chilean theater (2010)

References

External links
 

1943 births
20th-century Chilean male actors
21st-century Chilean male actors
20th-century Chilean dramatists and playwrights
Chilean male film actors
Chilean male stage actors
Chilean male telenovela actors
Chilean theatre directors
Living people
Place of birth missing (living people)
Academic staff of the University of Santiago, Chile
21st-century Chilean dramatists and playwrights
Chilean male dramatists and playwrights